Horní Radouň is a municipality and village in Jindřichův Hradec District in the South Bohemian Region of the Czech Republic. It has about 200 inhabitants.

Administrative parts
Villages of Bukovka, Nový Bozděchov and Starý Bozděchov are administrative parts of Horní Radouň.

References

Villages in Jindřichův Hradec District